Banaswadi railway station (station code: BAND) is an Indian Railways train station located in Banaswadi, Bangalore, in the Indian state of Karnataka, which is about 12 km away from the Bangalore City railway station and serves the Banaswadi and Baiyyappanahalli areas.

Structure 
Banaswadi has three platforms, each running to 400m in length, shelters, lighting, benches and a booking office.

Line
From Baiyappanahalli, trains can either turn to the single diesel line to  via  or continue straight towards .

Originating/terminating trains

See also 
 List of railway stations in India

References

External links

Railway stations in Bangalore
Bangalore railway division
Transport in Bangalore